The East Anglian Railway Museum is located at Chappel and Wakes Colne railway station in Essex, England, which is situated on the former Great Eastern Railway branch line from Marks Tey to Sudbury. Services on the Sudbury Branch Line are operated by Abellio Greater Anglia.

The museum has a wide collection of locomotives and rolling stock, some of which are fully restored, three are converted into Thomas, Percy and Toby replicas while others are undergoing repair and restoration. The Restoration Shed was built in 1983–4, before which most work had to take place in the Goods Shed or in the open. On event days, steam or diesel train rides are operated over a short demonstration track.

The museum also plays host to two popular annual events: the Winter Beer Festival held in late February / early March (Timing depends on UK School Holidays), and the Summer Beer Festival held each September. During the festivals, additional late-evening trains on the Sudbury Branch Line allow festival-goers to return home by train subject to provision by the train operation companies.  There are no moving exhibits during the festivals, although train carriages are usually open to sit in and drink, with one wagon doubling up as The Shunters Arms at the summer festival.

In addition many other event days happen during the year, such as Classic Car rallies, Forties and Fifties day events, SteamPunk fairs, Model Railway events, Plays and musical performances and the ever popular "Days out with Thomas" events featuring Thomas The Tank Engine.

Museum history

Formation of the society

The museum was originally formed as the Stour Valley Railway Preservation Society on 24 September 1968. The SVRPS was established at Chappel & Wakes Colne Station in December 1969 after a lease was obtained from British Rail to use the vacant goods yard and railway buildings, including the station building. The first public steam day took place three months later.

The goods shed and station buildings were quickly restored; with a workshop being set up in the goods shed to enable maintenance and restoration work to be undertaken on the rolling stock.

The birth of the museum

The Stour Valley Railway Preservation Society was renamed to The East Anglian Railway Museum in 1986 to confirm its focus on representing railway history of the Eastern Counties rather than just operating trains. The museum gained charitable status in 1991 (Registered Charity No. 1001579) and became a Registered Museum in 1995.

Since 2005, the museum has had a greater emphasis on interpretation and display facilities, a large variety of events take place each year to raise funds to support the museum's activities.

Steam locomotives

The museum has a collection of industrial steam locomotives, in various states of repair.

Operational
Bagnall 0-4-0ST outside cylinder Works No. 2542 "Jubilee" built in 1936 for the Bowaters Paper Railway.
Returned to traffic in April 2007 after an 18 month overhaul and now used regularly on steam services.
Painted bright green and received some cosmetic changes to be Percy the Small Engine from Thomas the Tank Engine & Friends.
Andrew Barclay 0-4-0ST outside cylinder Works No. 1047 "Storefield" built in 1905.
Returned to traffic in 1999 after a rebuild. Withdrawn from service in 2005 and a further overhaul was completed in August 2015.
Painted lined light brown.
RSH 0-6-0ST inside cylinder No. 54 "Pen Green" built in 1941. (Works No. 7031)
Entered service on 21 March 2008 following conversion into a form of Thomas the Tank Engine. Overhauled in Spring 2017, boiler ticket expires in 2027.

Under overhaul
W.G. Bagnall 0-6-0ST outside cylinder Works No. 2670 Lamport No.3.
Built in 1942. Arrived at the East Anglian Railway Museum in March 2013 from the Battlefield Line Railway. Painted dark green, lined-out in red and yellow. This locomotive is currently undergoing overhaul. The locomotive will need new boiler tubes and a new firebox.

London North Eastern Railway class N7 0-6-2T inside cylinder No. 7999 (BR No. 69621) "A J Hill " Built in 1924, 
Returned to Service in 2005 after many years of sterling work on both preserved railways and the main line. Boiler ticket expired in April 2015. Currently undergoing overhaul, boiler removed from the frames August 2020.

Awaiting overhaul or on Static Display

Peckett and Sons 0-4-0ST outside cylinder Works No. 2039 "Jeffrey".
Built in 1943. Currently on static display outside the museum entrance, painted black, lined-out in red and white.

Diesel Locomotives
The museum has a collection of industrial diesel locomotives.

Operational
Drewry 0-4-0 War Department no. D72229.
 Operational and on hire from Andrew Briddon Locos due to class 04 overhaul. Painted in Army Green and now a regular on shunting and some passenger duties.
Andrew Barclay 0-4-0 Works No.333 "John Peel".
Operational but only used occasionally due to lack of electric start. Painted blue.
John Fowler 0-4-0DH Works No. 4220039 7 "Toby".
Converted cosmetically to look like Toby for Day out with Thomas events. Painted in brown and grey.
British Rail Class 04 0-6-0DM D2279.

Overhaul completed in 2018 and returned to the EARM the same year. Painted in BR Brunswick green.

Under Restoration

Simplex 0-4-0 No. 2029.
Undergoing heavy restoration. Painted black.

Diesel multiple units

Two Class 101 DMU cars are in operation at the museum. The units are owned by Diesel Unit Preservation Associates Ltd. DUPA own one other Class 101 unit (E51505 at Ecclesbourne Valley Railway) and two Class 108 units (E50599 at Ecclesbourne Valley Railway and M56223 at Llangollen Railway). Car number E56358 is painted in BR Blue with full yellow ends while E51213 is painted in BR Blue Grey with full yellow ends. Both cars have had their original pattern tungsten lighting reinstated. No. E56358 and No. E51213 were regular performers on the Marks Tey to Sudbury Line until 1993 when all 1st generation units were withdrawn in East Anglia and were transferred to Manchester, both withdrawn from service in 2001, then stored at MOD Shoeburyness before being purchased in 2003. They represented the Class 101 DMU class at Railcar50. The unit is mainly used on Day Out With Thomas Events where it runs as Daisy The Diesel Multiple Unit.

British Rail Class 101 DMBS No. E51213 Operational.  Built in 1958.
British Rail Class 101 DTC No. E56358 Operational. Built in 1959.

Electric multiple units

British Rail Class 306 unit 017 was transferred to the museum in mid-2011 for a four-year loan period from the National Railway Museum. The unit left the museum in October 2018.

In 2021, the museum acquired a driving vehicle from British Rail Class 317 unit 317345. It was donated by Angel Trains.

Concert by Blur

On 13 June 2009, alternative rock band Blur performed a concert at the museum, where they had performed their first concert in 1988. As in 1988, the band played to around 150 people in a goods shed. This concert was their first since 2001 and the first show of their 2009 mini-tour, which was followed by the band headlining at the Glastonbury Festival and performing two concerts in Hyde Park.

In November 2009, a plaque was erected on the East Anglian Railway Museum by PRS for Music. The Heritage Award was a celebration of Blur and the location of their first live performance.

References

External links

East Anglian Railway Museum website.
Chappel Beer Festival Website.
Events at The East Anglian Railway Museum website.

Heritage railways in Essex
Railway museums in England
Museums in Essex